{{DISPLAYTITLE:Theta1 Orionis D}}

Theta1 Orionis D (θ1 Orionis D) is a member of the Trapezium open cluster that lies within the Orion Nebula. It is a B class blue main sequence star with several faint companions.

θ1 Orionis consists of multiple components, primarily the four stars of the Trapezium cluster (A, B, C, and D) all within one arc-minute of each other. θ2 Orionis is a more distant grouping of three main stars plus several fainter companions, 1-2 arc-minutes from θ1.

θ1 D itself has a faint optical companion 1.4" away and a spectroscopic companion in a 40-day orbit. Infrared Optical Telescope Array observations suggest another companion at 18.6 mas.

References

Orionis, Theta1, D
Orionis, 41, D
Orion (constellation)
B-type main-sequence stars
037023
1896
026224
Durchmusterung objects